This is a list of school districts in British Columbia. British Columbia in Canada is divided into 60 school districts which administer publicly funded education until the end of grade 12 in local areas or, in the case of francophone education, across the province.



Changes
Many school districts were in existence prior to British Columbia joining Canada in 1871. Some districts were just single schools or even one teacher. Traditionally school districts in British Columbia were either municipal, which were named after the municipality such as Vancouver or Victoria, or rural and given a regional name. Many districts' names are a legacy of this pattern. In 1946, the Ministry of Education rearranged the province's 650 school districts into 79, giving each a number and a name. The school districts were numbered geographically started in the southeast corner and proceeding in a counter-clockwise pattern. This has been disrupted by successive changes to districts. The most recent changes occurred in April 1996 with the restructuring and reduction in the number of school districts from 79 to 57.

References

External links
BC Schools Book
Map of BC School Districts
Summary of Key Information for BC School Districts
BC School District Summary and Performance Reports

School districts
British Columbia